James Douglas Conley (born March 19, 1955) is an American prelate of the Roman Catholic Church who has been serving as bishop of the Diocese of Lincoln in Nebraska since 2012. He served as an auxiliary bishop in the Archdiocese of Denver from 2008 to 2012.

Biography

Early life 
Raised in a Presbyterian family, James Conley was born on March 19, 1955, in Kansas City, Missouri, to Carl and Betty Conley. He has one sister by adoption, Susan. Conley is of Wea Native American descent through his paternal grandmother's family. The family moved to Denver, Colorado, in 1957, and to Arvada, Colorado, in 1959.

James Conley attended Hoskinson Cottage School in Arvada before moving to Overland Park, Kansas, at age eight. He was a childhood friend of Paul S. Coakley, who later became  archbishop of Oklahoma City in 2011.  Conley graduated from Shawnee Mission West High School in Shawnee Mission, Kansas, in 1973, and then entered the University of Kansas (KU); because of his Native American heritage, the Bureau of Indian Affairs paid for a portion of his college education. He studied in KU's Integrated Humanities Program, whose courses on Greek and Roman classics led him to convert to Catholicism on December 6, 1975.

Conley obtained a Bachelor of English Literature degree from KU in 1977, and then worked in construction in Kansas City, Kansas, before traveling through Europe. He considered a monastic vocation while staying at the Abbey of Notre Dame de Fontgombault in Fontgombault, France. Conley returned to Kansas in 1978, and worked on a friend's farm near Courtland, Kansas. In 1980, he decided to pursue a vocation to the priesthood and entered St. Pius X Seminary in Erlanger, Kentucky. Conley later studied at Mount St. Mary's Seminary in Emmitsburg, Maryland, where he earned a Master of Divinity degree in 1985.

Priesthood 
Conley was ordained a priest by Bishop Eugene Gerber for the Diocese of Wichita on May 18, 1985. After his ordination, Conley was assigned as associate pastor at St. Patrick Parish. In 1989, Bishop Gerber sent him to Rome, where he earned a Licentiate in Moral Theology from the Alphonsian Academy of the Pontifical Lateran University. Upon his return to Kansas in 1991, Conley became chaplain of the Newman Center at Wichita State University in Wichita, Kansas, and diocesan director of the Respect Life Office. His parents converted to Catholicism in 1991;  Conley administered the sacraments of baptism and confirmation to them.

In 1996, Conley returned to Rome to serve as an official of the Congregation for Bishops in the Roman Curia. During this period, Conley also served as chaplain at the University of Dallas' Rome campus (1997-2003) and as adjunct instructor of theology at Christendom College's Rome campus (2004-2006). He was raised to the rank of chaplain of his holiness by John Paul II on February 9, 2001. Returning to Wichita in 2006, Conley was named pastor of Blessed Sacrament Church in Wichita.

Auxiliary Bishop of Denver 
On April 10, 2008, Conley was appointed as an auxiliary bishop of the Archdiocese of Denver and titular bishop of Cissa by Pope Benedict XVI. He was consecrated on May 30, 2008, by Archbishop Charles Chaput, with Bishop Michael Jackels and Archbishop Paul S. Coakley of Oklahoma City serving as co-consecrators, at the Cathedral Basilica of the Immaculate Conception. His episcopal motto, "Cor Ad Cor Loquitur (Latin: "Heart Speaks To Heart"), is taken from the motto of Cardinal John Newman.

Speaking on proposed health care legislation in November 2009, Conley stated that Catholic bishops: "have a few simple but important priorities. First, everyone should have access to basic health care, including immigrants...Second, reform should respect the dignity of every person, from conception to natural death... Third, real healthcare reform needs to include explicit, ironclad conscience protections for medical professionals and institutions so that they cannot be forced to violate their moral convictions. Fourth—and this is so obvious it sometimes goes unstated—any reform must be economically realistic and financially sustainable."In September 2011, when Archbishop Chaput was appointed as archbishop of the Archdiocese of Philadelphia, Conley became apostolic administrator of the Archdiocese of Denver.  He fulfilled this responsibility until July 2012, when Bishop Samuel Aquila was named Chaput's successor.

Bishop of Lincoln
On September 14, 2012, Pope Benedict XVI appointed Conley as bishop of the Diocese of Lincoln, succeeding Bishop Fabian Bruskewitz. Conley was installed on November 20, 2012, at the Cathedral of the Risen Christ in Lincoln.

In 2003, the Diocese of Lincoln diocese participated in the first audit of implementation of the Charter for the Protection of Children and Young People. Bruskewitz declined to participate in later audits because he wase awaiting refinements to the process.  In June 2014, the chairman of the U.S. Conference of Catholic Bishops (USCCB)  National Review Board for the Protection of Children reported that the Diocese of Lincoln was one of four American dioceses not in audit compliance.

According to a 2015 statement by Conley, the Lincoln Diocese complied with all church and civil laws on child-abuse reporting and child protection; he stated that the audit process had been improved, and that the diocese would now participate.

On December 13, 2019, Conley announced that he was taking a medical leave of absence to treat depression, anxiety, insomnia, and tinnitus. Archbishop George Lucas was appointed to serve as apostolic administrator during Conley’s  leave of absence. Conley returned to active service on November 13, 2020.

See also

 Catholic Church hierarchy
 Catholic Church in the United States
 Historical list of the Catholic bishops of the United States
 List of Catholic bishops of the United States
 Lists of patriarchs, archbishops, and bishops

References

External links
 Roman Catholic Diocese of Lincoln Official Site

 

21st-century Roman Catholic bishops in the United States
1955 births
Living people
People from Kansas City, Missouri
Roman Catholic Diocese of Wichita
Roman Catholic Archdiocese of Denver
Roman Catholic bishops of Lincoln
Converts to Roman Catholicism from Presbyterianism
University of Dallas faculty
Christendom College
University of Kansas alumni
Alphonsian Academy alumni
Mount St. Mary's University alumni
Religious leaders from Missouri
Catholics from Missouri
American people of Native American descent